The Virginia Slims Championships was held twice in 1986 because of a change of schedule from March to November.

It was the fifteenth season-ending WTA Tour Championships, the annual tennis tournament for the best female tennis players in singles on the 1985 WTA Tour, which ran from March 1985 to March 1986. It was held from March 17 through March 23, 1986 in New York City, New York in the United States. First-seeded Martina Navratilova won the singles title.

Finals

Singles

   Martina Navratilova defeated   Hana Mandlíková 6–2, 6–0, 3–6, 6–1

Doubles

  Hana Mandlíková /  Wendy Turnbull defeated   Claudia Kohde-Kilsch /  Helena Suková 6–4, 6–7(4–7), 6–3

References

External links
 WTA tournament edition details
 ITF tournament edition details

WTA Tour Championships
Virginia Slims Championships
Virginia Slims Championships
Virginia Slims Championships
1980s in Manhattan
Virginia Slims Championships
Madison Square Garden
Sports competitions in New York City
Sports in Manhattan
Tennis tournaments in New York City